Lycenchelys alba is a species of marine ray-finned fish belonging to the family Zoarcidae, the eelpouts.

Description
Its head pores are large and oval.

Habitat

References

alba
Fish described in 1888
Fish of the North Atlantic
Taxa named by Léon Vaillant